Roderick Alexander Munro (27 July 1920 – July 1976) was a Scottish professional football full back who played for Brentford and Cambridge City. He is best remembered for his seven years in the Football League with Brentford, making over 200 appearances.

Career

Rangers 
A full back, Munro began his career in Scotland as an amateur with Scottish League First Division club Rangers in 1938, but the breakout of the Second World War in 1939 and the suspension of professional football brought a halt to his career.

Brentford 
A year after the end of the Second World War in 1945, Munro joined Brentford as an amateur, on the recommendation of Tom Manley, with whom he had served in the Middle East during the war. He played the final five games of the 1945–46 Football League South season. Munro signed a professional contract during the 1946 off-season and with the resumption of league football, he made his debut in a 5–2 First Division defeat to Aston Villa on 28 September 1946. He made 38 appearances in his debut season, which ended with the Bees suffering relegation to Second Division. Munro was a regular fixture in the team until the end of the 1952–53 season, when he departed Griffin Park. He made 211 appearances during his time with the Bees.

Cambridge City 
Munro ended his career with at Athenian League club Cambridge City.

Personal life 
Munro grew up in the hamlet of Aultbea in the Highlands of Scotland. He met his wife Sheena in Cairo while serving in the Second World War and they had two children. While with Brentford, Munro and his wife Sheena provided accommodation for Aultbea-native Hugh Urquhart, who failed to make the grade at the Bees and dropped into non-league football. The couple settled in Hauxton, Cambridgeshire in the 1950s and worked for Fisons. Munro died in 1976 and was survived by Sheena, who died in Skegness in February 2008.

Career statistics

References

People from Highland (council area)
Scottish footballers
Association football fullbacks
Brentford F.C. players
English Football League players
1920 births
Rangers F.C. players
Scottish Football League players
Cambridge City F.C. players
1976 deaths
People from South Cambridgeshire District
Colchester United F.C. players
Southern Football League players
Royal Air Force personnel of World War II